Busseron is an unincorporated community in Busseron Township, Knox County, Indiana, United States.

Geography

History
Busseron was surveyed by George Calhoun in 1854. W. W. Harper, J. A. McClure and T. P. Emison were proprietors. It was a station on the Evansville & Terre Haute Railroad. As early as the 1920s, Busseron was not so much a town and just simply a railroad station.

References

Unincorporated communities in Knox County, Indiana
Unincorporated communities in Indiana